COMM domain-containing protein 9 is a protein that in humans is encoded by the COMMD9 gene.

References

External links

Further reading